Stutfield Peak is a mountain in Jasper National Park, Alberta, Canada. The peak has two summits - Stutfield East and Stutfield West - and is therefore sometimes referred to as The Stutfields.

In 1899, mountaineer J. Norman Collie named the mountain after Hugh Stutfield, who climbed with Collie during his exploration of the Canadian Rockies.

Stufield Glacier was also named after Hugh Stutfield, and flows southeast from the peak, in the Columbia Icefield.


Climate

Based on the Köppen climate classification, it is located in a subarctic climate with cold, snowy winters, and mild summers.

See also
List of mountains of Canada

References

External links
 Parks Canada web site: Jasper National Park

Three-thousanders of Alberta
Winston Churchill Range
Mountains of Jasper National Park